Buyspoort Pass, (also spelled Buispoort) is a mountain pass located in the Eastern Cape province of South Africa on the National N9 road (South Africa), between Uniondale and Willowmore. Its name derives from the surname Buys and poort, the Afrikaans word for gate.

References

Mountain passes of the Eastern Cape